Podocarpus hispaniolensis is a species of conifer in the family Podocarpaceae. It is endemic to the Dominican Republic.

This tree grows in rainforest habitat with Prestoea montana, Clusia clusioides, Cyrilla racemiflora, Byrsonima lucida, Didymopanax tremulus, Haenianthus salicifolius, and Magnolia pallescens. The population of this plant is fragmented and made up of scattered individuals. The habitat is degraded by logging. The timber of this species has been overharvested for construction wood.

References

hispaniolensis
Endangered plants
Endemic flora of the Dominican Republic
Taxonomy articles created by Polbot
Taxa named by David John de Laubenfels